Josephine Feeney is a British children's author. She writes novels, short stories and plays.

Her work has been published by HarperCollins, Penguin and Puffin.

References

Living people
Year of birth missing (living people)
Place of birth missing (living people)
British women children's writers